Kuzuköy can refer to:

 Kuzuköy, Çankırı
 Kuzuköy, Elmalı